The 2024 AFC Women's Olympic Qualifying Tournament will be the sixth edition of the AFC Women's Olympic Qualifying Tournament, the quadrennial international football competition organised by the Asian Football Confederation (AFC) to determine which women's national teams from Asia qualify for the Olympic football tournament. 

The top two teams of the tournament will qualify for the 2024 Summer Olympics women's football tournament in France as the AFC representatives.

Format
Of the 47 AFC member associations, a total of 31 AFC member national teams entered the qualifying stage. The format is as follows:
First round: The five highest-ranked teams in the FIFA Women's World Rankings as of 9 December 2022, which were North Korea, Japan, Australia, China PR and South Korea, received byes to the second round. The remaining 26 teams will be divided into five groups of four and two groups of three and compete in a one-round league format in a centralised venue. The winners of each group in this round will then advance to the second round.
Second round: The twelve teams (five teams who entered this round and seven teams from the first round) will be drawn into three groups of four teams and compete in a one-round league format in a centralised venue. The three group winners and the best-ranked runners-up in this round will then advance to the third round.
Third round: The four teams will play two pairs of home and away matches with the two eventual winners qualifying for the Women’s Olympic Football Tournament.

Teams
The draw for the first round was held on 12 January 2023, 15:00 MYT, at the AFC House in Kuala Lumpur, Malaysia. 

Notes
Teams in bold qualified for the Olympics.
Numbers in parentheses indicate the December 2022 FIFA Women's World Rankings (otherwise unranked).
(H): Qualification first round group hosts (* all chosen as group hosts after the draw, the remaining group hosted at a neutral venue)
(N): Not a member of the International Olympic Committee, ineligible for Olympics
(W): Withdrew after draw

Did not enter




 (85)
 (86)
 (89)
 (94)
 (114)
 (120)
 (157)

First round
The first round will be played between 3–11 April 2023.

Group A

Group B

Group C

Group D

Group E

Group F

Group G

Second round
The draw for the second round of the qualifiers will be held at the AFC House in Kuala Lumpur, Malaysia. For the second round, the twelve teams will be drawn into three groups of four teams. The teams are seeded according to their latest FIFA Rankings at the time of the draw.

Group A

Group B

Group C

Third round
The third round is scheduled for 27 November and 6 December 2023. The two final round winners will qualify for the 2024 Summer Olympics.

|}

Qualified teams
The following two teams from AFC qualify for the 2024 Summer Olympic women's football tournament.

See also
2024 AFC U-23 Asian Cup (men's Olympic qualifiers)

References

External links
, the-AFC.com

2024
Football at the 2024 Summer Olympics – Women's qualification